Place Without a Postcard is the third studio album by Australian alternative rockers, Midnight Oil, which was released in November 1981 under Sprint Music and the Columbia Records label. It peaked at No. 12 on the Kent Music Report albums chart and the related singles "Don't Wanna Be the One" and "Armistice Day" reached the associated Top 40 chart.

Background
The band's third LP Place Without a Postcard, released by CBS Records in November 1981, was recorded in Sussex with English producer Glyn Johns (The Rolling Stones, The Who) at a studio/barn on Johns' property. Creative tensions between the band and Johns plagued the recording and the group were not totally happy with the outcome. Johns had an arrangement with A&M Records and they asked Midnight Oil to return to the studio to record material suitable for an American single release – the group refused and returned to Australia. Place without a Postcard peaked at No. 12 on the albums charts and related singles "Don't Wanna Be the One" (No. 40) and "Armistice Day" reached the Top 40 in Australia. Cover and other photography by Robert Butcher.

Reception
The album scored 3/5 at AllMusic. That site's William Ruhlmann wrote:

"Midnight Oil went to England to record and turned to a major label (CBS Records) and a name producer (Glyn Johns) for its third full-length album. You might have expected this to make for a sonic breakthrough, but you'd be wrong. The band was experiencing growing pains, trying to stretch musically, and, at least at first, this made for a dilution of their hard rock focus moving toward a pop style they hadn't fully developed. Place Without a Postcard had its share of powerfully performed songs, but its sound was light compared to the band's first two albums, the stylistic experiments were not yet bearing fruit, and, with an emphasis placed on the vocals, Peter Garrett sounded overly strident."

Track listing

Charts

Certifications

Personnel
Midnight Oil
 Peter Garrett – lead vocals
 Peter Gifford – bass, vocals
 Rob Hirst – drums, vocals
 Jim Moginie – guitars, keyboards
 Martin Rotsey – guitars

Production
 Glyn Johns - production, engineering
 Sean Fullen - assistant engineer

Design
 Robert Butcher - design, album cover photo

References

External links
 Midnight Oil

Midnight Oil albums
Sprint Music albums
1981 albums
Albums produced by Glyn Johns